Gucheng Subdistrict is a subdistrict located in the center of Shijingshan District , Beijing, China. It shares border with Guangning, Jindingjie and Pingguoyuan Subdistrict in the north, Lugu and Bajiao Subdistricts in the east, Beigong Town in the south, and Yongding Township in the west. In 2020, it had a population of 67,685.

The subdistrict name, Gucheng, was inherited from a village that used to exist in the region.

History

Administrative Division 
In 2021, Gucheng Subdistrict is made up of 21 communities:

See also 
 List of township-level divisions of Beijing

References 

Shijingshan District
Subdistricts of Beijing